Blueback is a short novel by the Australian author Tim Winton. First published in 1997, it has since been translated into Italian, Dutch and Japanese.

Tim Winton on Blueback 
"I don't know whether books like Blueback make a difference, but in an innocent way, it's discussing these things - we have been taking from the sea and the land for so long, it's time for us to give something back. "I feel very specifically that I benefited from growing up where I did, where so much revolved around the sea - in a way, it was a gift and I owe it something. If the sea is ultimately where we come from, and it seems we did, then it's our source, our ancestral life and we are obliged to nourish it."

Reviews 
The New York Times review said that "Winton ... convince[s] us of the preciousness of our oceans not through lectures but through his characters' steady wonder."

Alexa Dretzke reviewed:   ... we have a boy who loves the sea. It is his boy and part of his family's past. He loves a big, old fish that swims with him and he loves his mother, who taught him the ways of the sea and how to respect Winton's homage to a landscape he hopes will prevail. This is a superb modern Australian classic for every child and adult.

Adaptations 
In 2005, Blueback adapted into a magic mike show by Spare Parts Puppet Theatre, located in Fremantle staged its Premier performance.  It then staged performances in Regional Schools in 2008, 2009 and 2010.  The play then returned to Fremantle in 2011, and performed at the Mandurah Performing Arts Theatre in 2012, before returning to Fremantle again in 2015. There was also a Regional Schools Tour in 2015.

In 2021, Blueback was adapted into an Australian feature film written and directed by Robert Connolly, was released in Australia on 1 January 2023. It stars Mia Wasikowska, Radha Mitchell, Erik Thomson, Eddie Baroo and Eric Bana.

Awards 
 1998 Bolinda Audio Book Awards
 1998 Wilderness Society Environment Award
 1999 WAYRBA Hoffman Award for Young Readers

References 

1997 Australian novels
Australian adventure novels
Australian children's novels
Australian magic realism novels
Australian novellas
Australian novels adapted into films
Australian novels adapted into plays
Australian young adult novels
Environmental fiction books
Fables
Nautical novels
Novels by Tim Winton
Pan Books books